The Continuing Appropriations Resolution, 2013 is a US federal enactment, namely a temporary spending bill to fund the government for six months until March 27, 2013, in order to prevent an October 1, 2012 government shutdown.

Legislative history 
 September 13, 2012: Passed the United States House of Representatives 329-91
 September 22, 2012: Passed the United States Senate 62-30
 September 28, 2012: President Barack Obama signed the bill

Summary 

 Rate of Operations – The CR continues funding at the current rate of operations for federal agencies, programs and services. To meet the bipartisan agreement between the House, Senate and White House that ensured a total rate of operations at $1.047 trillion, a government-wide, across-the-board increase of 0.6 percent over the base rate is also included. In total, including all discretionary spending, the annual rate of the CR is $26.6 billion below last year's level.
 Disaster and War Spending – The bill continues funding for the FEMA Disaster Relief Fund (DRF) at last year's level, including $6.4 billion in BCA disaster designated funding. This funding is used to provide relief and recovery efforts following disasters, such as the recent Hurricane Isaac. The bill also provides $88.5 billion in war-related funding for Department of Defense (DOD) Overseas Contingency Operations (OCO), the amount requested by the Administration.
 General Items – Virtually all policy and funding provisions included in currently enacted Appropriations legislation will carry forward in the CR. However, some changes to current law are needed to prevent catastrophic, irreversible, or detrimental changes to government programs, or to ensure good government and program oversight. Some of these provisions include:
A provision allowing DOD to acquire supplies in other countries for use in Afghanistan.
A provision allowing additional funding for nuclear weapons modernization efforts, to ensure the safety, security, and reliability of the nation's nuclear stockpile.
A provision allowing flexibility for the Customs and Border Protection to maintain current staffing levels.
A provision allowing additional funding and flexibility to sustain Homeland Security cybersecurity efforts.
A provision allowing additional funding for the Interior Department and the Forest Service for wildfire suppression efforts.
A provision allowing additional funding for the Veterans Administration to meet an increase in the disability claims workload.
A provision extending the current pay freeze for federal employees, which includes Members of Congress and Senators.
A provision allowing the launch schedule of new weather satellites to move forward, ensuring the continuation of critical weather information, especially in the event of weather-related natural disasters.
A provision requiring every federal agency to provide spending plans to Congress to ensure transparency and the proper use of taxpayer dollars.

United States federal appropriations legislation
Acts of the 112th United States Congress